Kénogami may refer to several places in Lac-Saint-Jean, Quebec:
Kenogami Lake
Kenogami River
The former city of Kénogami, now a part of Jonquière

Other
 , a Flower-class corvette named for the region.

See also
Kenogami Lake, Ontario
Kenogami Lake Station